Varronia rupicola, synonym Cordia rupicola, commonly known as the Puerto Rico manjack, is a critically endangered species of flowering shrub in the borage family, Boraginaceae, that is native to the islands of Puerto Rico and Anegada.

Taxonomy
The species was discovered by German botanical collector Paul Sintenis in 1886.

Description

Varronia rupicola is a small woody shrub that measures  in height.

Distribution and habitat
The species was believed to be endemic to Puerto Rico until it was described from the island of Anegada in 1987. The species was discovered in Los Indios, between Guayanilla and barrio Barinas in Yauco in 1886. A year later it was found in Guánica. Two reports of a single specimen exist from the island of Vieques but no population has been confirmed. In 1995 fifteen plants were found east of the historical locations at El Peñón in Peñuelas.

El Peñón is a privately owned subtropical dry forest site located in a limestone substrate. The area has a sparse, low brush with a few taller trees reaching . These trees include Bourreria succulenta var. succulenta, Bucida buceras, and Bursera simaruba.

Two Anegada sites, each with a few dozen individuals, have been confirmed. In Anegada the species is locally abundant in limestone and sand dunes, showing a slight preference for limestone.

The IUCN assessment considered all Puerto Rican populations extirpated.

See also
List of endemic flora of Puerto Rico

References

Further reading
Endangered species of Puerto Rico and the Virgin Islands: 
Extinctions of native flora of Puerto Rico: 

Boraginaceae
Plants described in 1886
Flora of Puerto Rico
Flora of the British Virgin Islands
Critically endangered plants
Anegada